The Indian national cricket team toured Australia in the 1991–92 season, just before the 1992 Cricket World Cup. The team was led by Mohammed Azharuddin and played 5 Test matches. Australia won the Test series 4-0. The series is notable from an Indian point of view for Ravi Shastri's double hundred, Sachin Tendulkar's 114 on a bouncy pitch at Perth while the other Indian batsmen struggled, and Kapil Dev becoming the first Indian bowler to take 400 wickets in Tests.  The series also saw the debut of Australia's leading Test wicket-taker, Shane Warne.

Test Series

First Test

Second Test

Third Test

Fourth Test

Fifth Test
{{Test match
 | date =1–5 February 1992
 | team1 =
 | team2 =

 | score-team1-inns1 =346 (125.5 overs)
 | runs-team1-inns1 =David Boon 107 (304)
 | wickets-team1-inns1 =Manoj Prabhakar 5/101 (32.5 overs)

 | score-team2-inns1 =272 (89.5 overs)
 | runs-team2-inns1 =Sachin Tendulkar 114 (161)
 | wickets-team2-inns1 =Mike Whitney 4/68 (23 overs)

 | score-team1-inns2 =367/6d (113.3 overs)
 | runs-team1-inns2 =Dean Jones 150* (295)
 | wickets-team1-inns2 =Kapil Dev 2/48 (28 overs)

 | score-team2-inns2 =141 (55.1 overs)
 | runs-team2-inns2 =Kris Srikkanth 38 (116)
 | wickets-team2-inns2 =Mike Whitney 7/27 (12.1 overs)

 | result =Australia won by 300 runs
 | venue =WACA Ground, Perth
 | umpires =Tony Crafter (Aus) and Terry Prue (Aus)
 | report =Scorecard
 | toss =Australia won the toss and decided to bat.
 | rain =
 | motm=Mike Whitney (Aus)
 | notes= Wayne N. Phillips and Paul Reiffel (Aus) made their Test debuts.
Ian Healy (Aus) passed 1,000 runs in Tests.Kapil Dev (Ind) reached 400 wickets in Tests.
 This was Dilip Vengsarkar's last Test Match in International Cricket
}}

World Series Cup

Prior to the Test series, India also competed in the World Series Cup tri-nation One-Day International tournament involving Australia and the West Indies.  The West Indies brought a comparatively inexperienced team, having dropped Viv Richards and smarting from the recent retirements of Gordon Greenidge and Jeff Dujon. India won three of their eight round-robin matches and also tied one match against the West Indies. In the best-of-three final with Australia they lost 2-0.

External links
 CricketArchive
 Cricinfo

References

 Wisden Cricketers Almanack ''

1991 in Australian cricket
1991 in Indian cricket
1991–92 Australian cricket season
1992 in Australian cricket
1992 in Indian cricket
1991-92
International cricket competitions from 1991–92 to 1994